The 2020–21 Ohio Bobcats women's basketball team represented Ohio University during the 2020–21 NCAA Division I women's basketball season. The Bobcats, led by eighth year head coach Bob Boldon, played its home games at the Convocation Center in Athens, Ohio as a member of the Mid-American Conference.  This season was played during the ongoing COVID-19 pandemic.  As a result schedules were shortened and consolidated and most games were played without general fan attendance.

Ohio opened the non-conference slate of games with a win over Liberty and upset of national power Notre Dame.  They were named NCAA Team of the Week for their first week effort.

They finished the season 15-10, 11-6 in MAC play. They finished 3rd overall in the MAC.  They advanced to the semi-finals of the MAC women's tournament where they lost to Central Michigan. They received at-large bid to the WNIT where they lost to Clemson, defeated Fordham, and lost to Massachusetts.  Ohio was led by their point guard Cece Hooks who was named MAC player of the year.

Offseason

Departures

2020 recruiting class

Preseason
Prior to the season Ohio was picked second in the MAC preseason poll.  Cece Hooks and Erica Johnson were named to the preseason first team all-conference.

Preseason rankings

MAC Tournament Champion: Central Michigan (6), Ohio (3), Buffalo (1), Ball State (1), EMU (1)
Source

Preseason All-MAC 

Source

Award watch lists

Roster

Schedule

|-
!colspan=9 style=| Non-conference regular season

|-
!colspan=9 style=| MAC regular season

|-
!colspan=9 style=| Non-conference regular season

|-
!colspan=9 style=| MAC regular season

|-
!colspan=9 style=| MAC Women's Tournament

|-
!colspan=9 style=| WNIT

Awards and honors

Weekly Awards

Midseason awards watchlists

All-MAC Awards 

Source

National Awards

Rankings

*AP does not release post-NCAA Tournament rankings.^Coaches do not release a Week 1 poll.

Source

References

Ohio
Ohio Bobcats women's basketball seasons
Ohio Bobcats women's basketball
Ohio Bobcats women's basketball
Ohio